This article is about the particular significance of the year 1803 to Wales and its people.

Incumbents
Lord Lieutenant of Anglesey – Henry Paget 
Lord Lieutenant of Brecknockshire and Monmouthshire – Henry Somerset, 5th Duke of Beaufort (until 11 October); Henry Somerset, 6th Duke of Beaufort (from 4 November)
Lord Lieutenant of Caernarvonshire – Thomas Bulkeley, 7th Viscount Bulkeley
Lord Lieutenant of Cardiganshire – Thomas Johnes
Lord Lieutenant of Carmarthenshire – John Vaughan  
Lord Lieutenant of Denbighshire – Sir Watkin Williams-Wynn, 5th Baronet    
Lord Lieutenant of Flintshire – Robert Grosvenor, 1st Marquess of Westminster 
Lord Lieutenant of Glamorgan – John Stuart, 1st Marquess of Bute 
Lord Lieutenant of Merionethshire - Sir Watkin Williams-Wynn, 5th Baronet
Lord Lieutenant of Montgomeryshire – vacant until 1804
Lord Lieutenant of Pembrokeshire – Richard Philipps, 1st Baron Milford
Lord Lieutenant of Radnorshire – Thomas Harley

Bishop of Bangor – William Cleaver
Bishop of Llandaff – Richard Watson
Bishop of St Asaph – Lewis Bagot (until 4 June); Samuel Horsley 
Bishop of St Davids – Lord George Murray (until 3 June); Thomas Burgess (from 24 July)

Events
26 June - First public assembly of the South Wales Unitarian Association.
Robert Saunderson of Liverpool settles at Bala and becomes official printer to the Calvinistic Methodist Society, working for Thomas Charles.
17 July - Thomas Burgess is consecrated Bishop of St David's.
September - A new company, the Union Iron World Company, is formed to run Rhymney ironworks, after Benjamin Hall takes it over.
date unknown
Rhys Davies (Y Glun Bren) preaches from the mounting-block in front of the Black Lion Inn at Talybont in Cardiganshire, beginning Independent Methodist activity there.
Pascoe Grenfell contracts to trade in copper in the Swansea area.
Thomas Johnes sets up a private printing press to publish translations of French medieval chronicles.
Dunraven Castle is built, near Southerndown.
Benjamin Heath Malkin begins his travels in South Wales.
Paeonia mascula is discovered growing on the island of Steep Holm - the only species of peony native to the British Isles.

Arts and literature

New books
J. T. Barber - A Tour Throughout South Wales and Monmouthshire
Robert Davies (Bardd Nantglyn) - Barddoniaeth
William Owen Pughe - Geiriadur Cymraeg-Saesneg

Music

Births
10 May - Christopher Rice Mansel Talbot, landowner, industrialist and politician, owner of Margam Castle (died 1890)
29 June - Peter Maurice, priest and writer (died 1878) 
15 September - Charles Octavius Swinnerton Morgan, politician, historian and antiquary (died 1888) 
17 October - Samuel Holland, industrialist (died 1892)
18 October - Sir Richard Green-Price, 1st baronet, Liberal politician (died 1887)
23 November - Edward Edwards, zoologist (died 1879)
25 December - Sir Hugh Owen Owen, 2nd Baronet (died 1891).
date unknown
Dafydd Jones (Dewi Dywyll), balladeer (died 1868)
Owain Meirion, balladeer (died 1868)

Deaths
2 January - Sir Richard Perryn, judge, 79
29 April - Thomas Jones, landscape painter, 60
3 June - Lord George Murray, Bishop of St David's and developer of the UK's first optical telegraph, 42
28 September - Ralph Griffiths, editor and publisher, 83?
11 October - Henry Somerset, 5th Duke of Beaufort, Lord Lieutenant of Brecknockshire and Monmouthshire, 58
date unknown - Thomas Evans, London bookseller, 64

References

 
 Wales